Kitiya Thiangtham (born 30 June 1986) is a Thai former footballer who played as a forward. She has been a member of the Thailand women's national team.

International career
Thiangtham capped for Thailand at senior level during the 2008 AFC Women's Asian Cup process.

International goals
Scores and results list Chinese Taipei's goal tally first

References 

1986 births
Living people
Kitiya Thiangtham
Women's association football forwards
Kitiya Thiangtham
Footballers at the 2006 Asian Games
Kitiya Thiangtham